Carmen Steffens is a Brazilian company based in Franca, in the interior of São Paulo, founded by Mário Spaniol. They have 560 stores in 19 countries, including the United States, France, Brazil and Argentina.

With more than 3,500 employees, it has the second largest turnover in the bag and footwear industry in Brazil.

Their last campaigns star super model Alessandra Ambrosia and actress Camila Queiroz.

References

1993 establishments in Brazil
Clothing companies of Brazil
Companies based in São Paulo (state)
Companies established in 1993
Fashion accessory companies